Events from the year 1934 in Canada.

Incumbents

Crown 
 Monarch – George V

Federal government 
 Governor General – Vere Ponsonby, 9th Earl of Bessborough 
 Prime Minister – Richard Bedford Bennett
 Chief Justice – Lyman Poore Duff (British Columbia)
 Parliament – 17th

Provincial governments

Lieutenant governors 
Lieutenant Governor of Alberta – William Legh Walsh 
Lieutenant Governor of British Columbia – John William Fordham Johnson 
Lieutenant Governor of Manitoba – James Duncan McGregor (until December 1) then William Johnston Tupper  
Lieutenant Governor of New Brunswick – Hugh Havelock McLean  
Lieutenant Governor of Nova Scotia – Walter Harold Covert 
Lieutenant Governor of Ontario – Herbert Alexander Bruce 
Lieutenant Governor of Prince Edward Island – George Des Brisay de Blois 
Lieutenant Governor of Quebec – Henry George Carroll (until April 29) then Esioff-Léon Patenaude 
Lieutenant Governor of Saskatchewan – Hugh Edwin Munroe

Premiers 
Premier of Alberta – John Edward Brownlee (until July 10) then Richard Gavin Reid     
Premier of British Columbia – Duff Pattullo 
Premier of Manitoba – John Bracken 
Premier of New Brunswick – Leonard Tilley
Premier of Nova Scotia – Angus Lewis Macdonald
Premier of Ontario – George Stewart Henry (until July 10) then Mitchell Hepburn 
Premier of Prince Edward Island – William J. P. MacMillan
Premier of Quebec – Louis-Alexandre Taschereau 
Premier of Saskatchewan – James Thomas Milton Anderson (until July 19) then James Garfield Gardiner

Territorial governments

Commissioners 
 Controller of Yukon – George A. Jeckell 
 Commissioner of Northwest Territories – Hugh Rowatt (until April 30) then Vacant (Roy A. Gibson acting)

Events
March 9 - New Brunswick women win the right to hold office
June 19 - Ontario election: Mitchell Hepburn's Liberals win a majority, defeating George S. Henry's Conservatives
June 19 - Saskatchewan election: James Garfield Gardiner's Liberals win a majority, defeating James T.M. Anderson's Conservative-led coalition government
July 3 - The Bank of Canada is formed
July 10 - Mitchell Hepburn becomes premier of Ontario, replacing George Henry
July 10 - Richard G. Reid becomes premier of Alberta, replacing John Brownlee
July 19 - James Gardiner becomes premier of Saskatchewan for the second time, replacing James Anderson
August 14 - John Sackville Labatt kidnapped
October 26 - Reconstruction Party of Canada formed

Sport  
February 14 – The Ace Bailey Benefit Game (forerunner of the annual  National Hockey League All-Star Game) is played at Maple Leaf Gardens in Toronto.
April 5 – The Ontario Hockey Association's Toronto St. Michael's Majors win their first Memorial Cup by defeating the Edmonton Junior Hockey League's Edmonton Athletics 2 games to 0. All games were played at Shea's Amphitheatre in Winnipeg
November 24 – The Sarnia Imperials win their first Grey Cup by defeating the Regina Roughriders 20 to 12 in the 22nd Grey Cup played at Toronto's Varsity Stadium

Births

January to March

January 3 - Yves Gaucher, artist (d. 2000)
January 7 - Jean Corbeil, politician (d. 2002)
January 11 - Jean Chrétien, 20th Prime Minister of Canada
January 16 - Judy Erola, broadcaster and politician
January 19 - Lloyd Robertson, television news anchor and senior editor
January 23 - Pierre Bourgault, politician and essayist (d. 2003)

February 5 - Don Cherry, ice hockey player, coach and commentator
February 8 - Philip Seeman, schizophrenia researcher and neuropharmacologist (d. 2021)
March 7 - Douglas Cardinal, architect
March 9 - Marlene Streit, golfer
March 16 - Ray Hnatyshyn, politician and 24th Governor General of Canada (d. 2002)
March 24 - Alice Whitty, high jumper (d. 2017)

April to June
April 13 - John Muckler, ice hockey coach and executive (d. 2021)
May 17 - George Karpati, neurologist and neuroscientist (d. 2009)
May 28 - Dionne quintuplets, first quintuplets known to survive their infancy
June 7 - David Strangway, Canadian geophysicist and academic (d. 2016)
June 16 - Roger Neilson, ice hockey coach (d. 2003)
June 22
Willie Adams, politician and Senator
Nathan Nurgitz, lawyer, judge, and former Senator (d. 2019)
June 25 - Théodore Jean Arcand, diplomat (d. 2005)
June 27 - Norman Atkins, businessman and Senator (d. 2010)
June 30 - Aron Tager, Canadian actor (d. 2019)

July to September
July 8 - Fred Stewart, Alberta politician
July 12 - Mira Spivak, politician
July 13 - Peter Gzowski, broadcaster, writer and reporter (d. 2002)
July 16 - Albert Aguayo, neurologist
July 19 - Larry Zolf, journalist (d. 2011)
July 27 - Jim Elder, horse rider and Olympic gold medalist

August 16 - Douglas Kirkland, Canadian born American photographer (d. 2022 in the United States)
August 22 - Ralph Mellanby, sportscaster and television producer (d. 2022)
August 27 - Reggie Parks, wrestler and engraver (d. 2021)
August 31 - Herb Epp, politician, MPP of the Ontario Legislature for Waterloo North (19771990) (d. 2013)
September 21 - Leonard Cohen, singer-songwriter, musician, poet, novelist, and artist (d. 2016)
September 25 - Ronald Lou-Poy, lawyer and community leader (d. 2022)

October to December
October 1 - Margaret McCain, philanthropist and first female Lieutenant Governor of New Brunswick
October 4 - Rudy Wiebe, author and professor
October 5 - Kenneth D. Taylor, diplomat involved in the Iran hostage crisis (d. 2015)
November 6 - Barton Myers, American/Canadian architect
November 11 - Suzanne Lloyd, film and television actress
November 21 - Howard Pawley, politician, professor and 18th Premier of Manitoba (d. 2015)
November 26 - Conrad Santos, politician (d. 2016)
November 30 - Marcel Prud'homme, politician and Senator (d. 2017)
December 11 - Mike Nykoluk, ice hockey player and coach (d. 2022)
December 25 - Peter Trueman, journalist and news presenter (d. 2021)

Deaths
March 7 - John Hamilton-Gordon, 1st Marquess of Aberdeen and Temair, Governor General of Canada (b. 1847)
March 15 - Davidson Black, paleoanthropologist (b. 1884)
April 17 - Frank S. Cahill, politician (b. 1876)
July 28 - Marie Dressler, actress (b. 1868)
September 1 – William Anderson Black, politician (b. 1847)
October 4 - Henry Sproatt, architect (b. 1866)
November 10 - Sir Donald Mann, railway contractor and entrepreneur (b. 1853)

Historical documents
B.C. MLA Gerry McGeer says depression not "due to a reckless public" but businessmen who "expanded far beyond the needs of the time"

Prime Minister Bennett says nothing "spectacular" will be done to regain economic stability

Conservatives note 25,000 fewer families on relief by end of 1933, but C.C.F. leader finds no improvement in situation

Bill introduced to create Bank of Canada with initial capital of $5 million and "appropriate limitations" on loans

Newfoundland goes under rule by commission "until the credit of the country has been restored"

P.E.I. premier says Island's farming and fishing are "at low ebb," with fishermen "in dire straits"

Bennett government's resources marketing bill will end cutthroat competition in fisheries

P.E.I. merchant finds 1932 Commonwealth trade agreements have produced much export shipping in Halifax

Canadian Jewish Congress will raise $950,000 for German Jewish refugees and ruined businesses in Germany and Poland

MP Samuel William Jacobs indicts German consul-general in Montreal for anti-Semitic pamphlet "Germany's Fight for Western Civilization"

Prairie provinces and federal government assuming dictatorial powers over wheat in emergency control laws

Agriculture deputy minister tells Senate committee how Prairie grasshopper losses as high as 60% will be reduced to less than 10%

"Officials and supporters of the Wheat Pools of Western Canada" give advice to farmers by radio broadcast

Quebec dairy farmer tells Senate committee why he only breaks even and what causes Montreal milk middlemen to lose money

Toronto chain store, needle trade and other employers pay far below minimum wage while city expends $6.6 million in relief

"Preparation of a cavity for an Indian is exactly the same as for anyone else" - Dentist explains cost realities at Mohawk Institute Residential School

Indigenous art (described in past tense as it is "rapidly passing away") can be reinvigorated if promoted to tourists

References

 
Years of the 20th century in Canada
Canada
1934 in North America
1930s in Canada